Ramdoss, better known as Munishkanth, is an Indian actor who appears in Tamil language films. He had notable roles in films, including Mundasupatti (2014), Maanagaram (2017), Maragadha Naanayam (2017) and Raatchasan (2018).

Career 
Ramdoss came to Chennai from Oddanchatram in 2002, hoping to get a breakthrough as an actor in films and worked for several years as a junior artiste. Unable to get an immediate breakthrough, he moved to Malaysia for two years to work as a goldsmith before returning to Chennai and often slept homeless at Vadapalani temple. He became involved in short films, often portraying characters in the Naalaya Iyakkunar show on Kalaignar TV, and featured in Ram's original award-winning short film titled Mundasupatti by dubbing for the character of the aspiring actor, Munishkanth, at the insistence of his friend Kaali Venkat.

He continued on the fringe of the film industry, appearing in small roles in Mani Ratnam's Kadal (2013) and C. V. Kumar's Soodhu Kavvum (2013) and Pizza 2: Villa (2013), before being given the chance to portray Munishkanth in Ram's feature film debut Mundasupatti (2014). The film became a critical and commercial success, with Ramdoss portrayal being highly acclaimed by critics. He has since been popularly known as "Munishkanth". He has since worked on films including 10 Endrathukulla (2015), Pasanga 2 (2015) and Maragadha Naanayam  (2017). He rose to more fame after acting in crime mystery thriller Ratsasan (2018) alongside Vishnu Vishal.

Filmography

Films

Web series

References

External links 
 

Living people
Male actors in Tamil cinema
21st-century Indian male actors
Indian male comedians
Indian male film actors
Tamil male actors
Tamil comedians
1978 births